The Malcolm X Memorial Foundation is a non-profit organization, headquartered in Omaha, Nebraska, working to perpetuate the leadership and contributions of El Hajj Malik El-Shabazz (Malcolm X) towards social justice.

Founded by Rowena Moore, the organization is located on the site of Malcolm's first home in Omaha at 3448 Pinkney Street.

References

External links

Organizations based in Omaha, Nebraska
Malcolm X